Toesca is a metro station on the Line 2 of the Santiago Metro, in Santiago, Chile. It is located in the middle of a sunken stretch of the Autopista Central. The station is named for the nearby Toesca Street, which in turn is named after Joaquín Toesca, who designed La Moneda Palace.

The station was opened on 31 March 1978 as part of the inaugural section of the line, between Los Héroes and Franklin.

The station is close to the Palacio Cousiño.

References

Santiago Metro stations
Santiago Metro Line 2